Nicci French is the pseudonym of English husband-and-wife team Nicci Gerrard (born 10 June 1958) and Sean French (born 28 May 1959), who write psychological thrillers together.

Personal lives
Nicci Gerrard and Sean French were married in 1990. Since 1999 they have lived in Suffolk in East Anglia, England. Both have studied English literature at Oxford University. The couple have two daughters, Hadley and Molly, and Gerrard has two children from her first marriage, Edgar and Anna.

Biography

Nicci Gerrard
Nicola 'Nicci' Gerrard was born on 10 June 1958. She grew up in Worcestershire, together with her two sisters and her brother.

She was educated at The Alice Ottley School in Worcester. She then studied English literature at Oxford University and then an MPhil at Sheffield University in 1986. She went on to teach literature in Los Angeles and London. She founded a women's magazine, Women's Review, before becoming a freelance journalist. During that time she married and had two children.
 
Following the failure of this first marriage, she met Sean French whilst working as editor for the New Statesman where French wrote a weekly column, but left when she was offered another job at The Observer.

In November 2014 her father John Gerrard died, his dementia having deteriorated significantly during a five-week stay in hospital for an unrelated problem and with very restricted visiting by his family. As a result of this Gerrard launched John's Campaign for extended visiting rights for carers of patients with dementia.

Since February 2019, Gerrard has supported the 'Save Our Libraries Essex' (SOLE) campaign, speaking out against the proposed closures of libraries by Essex County Council.

Sean French
Julian Sean French was born on 28 May 1959 in Bristol, the son of Philip French, a radio producer and film critic, and his Swedish-born wife Kersti (née Molin). He was, like his two younger brothers Patrick and Karl, educated at William Ellis secondary school in north London before studying English literature at Oxford University. The couple never met while there. While at Oxford University, French won a young writers contest organised by Vogue, and subsequently became a journalist.

In 1987 he gained his first column and until the end of 2000 he wrote a column for the New Statesman. His solo novel Start from Here was published in 2004.

Works

as Nicci French

The Memory Game (1997)
The Safe House (1998)
Killing Me Softly (1999)
Beneath the Skin (2000)
The Red Room (2001)
The People Who Went Away (2001), a short story published as a novella for promotional purposes 
Grieve (2002), a short story published in Dutch as Verlies on the occasion of Thriller Month (Maand van het Spannende Boek).
Land of the Living (2003)
Secret Smile (2003), basis of British TV series Secret Smile.
Catch Me When I Fall (2005)
Losing You (2006)
Until It's Over (2007)
Speaking Ill of the Dead (2008), a short story published for promotional purposes
What to Do When Someone Dies (2008)
Complicit (2009), published in the United States as The Other Side of the Door (2010)
Blue Monday (A Frieda Klein Novel) (2011)
Tuesday's Gone (A Frieda Klein Novel) (2013)
Waiting for Wednesday (A Frieda Klein Novel) (2013)
Thursday's Child (A Frieda Klein Novel) (2014)
Friday on My Mind (A Frieda Klein Novel) (2015)
Saturday Requiem (A Frieda Klein Novel) (2016), published in the United States as Dark Saturday (2017)
Sunday Morning Coming Down (A Frieda Klein Novel) (2017), published in the United States as Sunday Silence
The Day of the Dead (A Frieda Klein Novel) (2018)
The Lying Room (2019)
House of Correction (2020)
The Unheard (2021)
The Favour (2022)

Works solely by Sean French
 Patrick Hamilton: A Life (1993), biography
 The Imaginary Monkey (1994), novel
 Bardot (1995), biography
 The Dream of Dreams (1996), novel
 Jane Fonda: A Biography (1998), biography
 Start from Here (2004), novel.

Works solely by Nicci Gerrard
Things we knew were true (Michael Joseph, 2003) – featuring teenage sisters, 
Soham (2004)
Solace (2005)
Simple in the Moonlight (2006)
The Moment you were Gone  (2007)
The Middle Place (2008)
The Winter House (2009)
Missing Persons (2011)
The Twilight Hour (2014)
’’What Dementia Teaches Us About Love’’ (2019)

References

External links

 Official website 2004–2014 (archived 2014-04-04)
 Nicci French at Penguin Books

 
 

English thriller writers
Writing duos
Married couples
Collective pseudonyms
Living people
British psychological fiction writers
20th-century English novelists
21st-century English novelists
20th-century pseudonymous writers
21st-century pseudonymous writers
Year of birth missing (living people)